Johannes "Jan" Baptist Norbertus Pijnenburg (15 February 1906 – 2 December 1979) was a Dutch track cyclist who competed in the 1928 Summer Olympics. He won the silver medal as part of the Dutch pursuit team. After the Olympics he turned professional and won six-day races in Dortmund (1931, 1932), Berlin (1931), Amsterdam (1932, 1933), Brussels (1932–1934), Paris (1932, 1934), Chicago (1932), Frankfurt (1933), Stuttgart (1933), Antwerp (1934, 1937), Rotterdam (1936) and Copenhagen (1936).

Honored by several people, retired in September 1940.

See also
 List of Dutch Olympic cyclists

References

External links

profile

1906 births
1979 deaths
Dutch male cyclists
Dutch track cyclists
Olympic cyclists of the Netherlands
Cyclists at the 1928 Summer Olympics
Olympic silver medalists for the Netherlands
Sportspeople from Tilburg
Olympic medalists in cycling
Medalists at the 1928 Summer Olympics
Cyclists from North Brabant
20th-century Dutch people